Saint Vulmar (or Ulmar, Vilmer, Vulmaire, Vulmar of Samer, Vulmarus, Wulmar; died 689) was a French priest, hermit and then abbot who was later venerated as a saint.
He turned to religion after his wife was taken from him and given to the man to whom she had previously been betrothed.

Life

Vulmar was born near Boulogne in Picardy, France.
He married, but was separated from his wife.
He became a lay brother at the Benedictine abbey in Hautmont in Hainault.
Later he became a priest and was the founding abbot of Samer monastery near Boulogne.
It is said that Vulmar hid in a hollow oak at Caëstre for three days to avoid unwelcome honors.
He is depicted as a hermit living in a hollow tree who receives bread from a peasant.
His feast day is 20 July.

Butler's account

According to the hagiographer Alban Butler,

Baring-Gould's account
  
According to Sabine Baring-Gould, Vulmar was the son of a Frankish nobleman named Vulbert.
When he was a young man he was married to a girl named Osterhilda.
However, when she was a child she had been promised by her parents to someone else.
That person complained to the king of the Franks, who ordered the separation of the young couple and gave Osterhilda to the person to whom shed had been betrothed.
Vulmar reacted by turning his back on the world and joining the monastery of Hautont in Hainault.
He was given the job of looking after cows. 

Eventually Vulmar was ordained a priest, but decided to live alone in the oak forest. 
For many years he lived in the Eeken forest, but when he was discovered returned to his place of birth and built a hermitage in the forest near Samer.
Over time both male and female disciples joined him, and he built two monasteries in the forest, one for men that he led and one for women under his niece Eremberta.
In 688 Ceadwalla, king of the West Saxons, visited him there while travelling to Rome, gave him 30 sous and said he would pray for him.
Vulmar died of old age just before or after the start of the 8th century and was buried at Samer.
The Huguenots later scattered his bones.

Notes

Sources

Further reading

Saints
7th-century deaths